Vladimir Semerdzhiev (born 27 May 1995) is a Bulgarian footballer who plays as a midfielder for Sportist Svoge.

Career
Semerdzhiev joined Slavia Sofia at the age of seven and progressed through the Slavia academy, earning a professional contract and a place in the first team squad in the process. On 17 May 2014, he made his senior team debut, as he came on as a substitute for Oleg Shalayev in Slavia last game of the season, a 2–0 home win over Pirin Gotse Delchev.

On 21 July 2017, Semerdzhiev was loaned to Second League club Lokomotiv Sofia.  On 18 June 2018, he was loaned to another club from the second tier, Tsarsko Selo.

Statistics
As of 11 May 2017

References

External links

Profile at pfcslavia.com

1995 births
Living people
Bulgarian footballers
PFC Slavia Sofia players
FC Lokomotiv 1929 Sofia players
FC Tsarsko Selo Sofia players
FC Sportist Svoge players
First Professional Football League (Bulgaria) players
Second Professional Football League (Bulgaria) players
Association football midfielders
Footballers from Sofia